Lady Windermere's Fan is a 1925 American silent drama film directed by Ernst Lubitsch. It is based on Oscar Wilde's 1892 play Lady Windermere's Fan which was first played in America by Julia Arthur as Lady Windermere and Maurice Barrymore as Lord Darlington. The film is being preserved by several archives. It was transferred onto 16mm film by Associated Artists Productions in the 1950s and shown on television. In 2002, Lady Windermere's Fan was selected for preservation in the United States National Film Registry by the Library of Congress, being deemed "culturally, historically, or aesthetically significant."

Plot
In London, Lady Margaret Windermere is busy discouraging Lord Darlington's flirting, while her husband receives a letter from Edith Erlynne, "a complete stranger," asking to meet him on an urgent matter. A woman of great beauty but terrible reputation, she reveals that she is the mother of Lady Windermere, who believes she is dead and reveres her memory. Fearing that his wife would be crushed by the truth and seeing a pile of bills on Mrs. Erlynne's desk, Lord Windermere gives her a cheque for £1500 for her silence.

Mrs. Erlynne resumes her scandalous lifestyle. At a horse race, she attracts the attention of many, including members of the Windermere party, notably Lord Augustus Lorton, "London's most distinguished bachelor," and three snoopy, gossipy women. As Lord Windermere defends Mrs. Erlynne to the latter, his wife becomes a bit concerned. Mrs. Erlynne leaves. Lorton follows and is soon calling on her regularly.

For Lady Windermere's birthday, her husband gives her jewelry and a lovely fan. When he leaves the mansion, she and Darlington by chance see him dismiss his chauffeur and take a taxi instead. Darlington then tells her that Mrs. Erlynne's name may be found in her husband's cheque book and declares his love for her. Meanwhile, Mrs. Erlynne blackmails Lord Windermere into an invitation to a ball that night, explaining that such "social recognition" might help elicit a marriage proposal from Lord Lorton. When he returns home, his wife confronts him with his copy of the £1500 cheque, which she found after breaking into his locked desk drawer. He tells her he only helped a deserving woman in need, but she becomes further infuriated when he informs her that Mrs. Erlynne will be coming to their ball that night.

Faced with his wife's strong opposition, he sends a note to Mrs. Erlynne, asking her not to come. She does not open it, assuming it is her invitation, and goes to the ball. She is not on the guest list, but then Lord Lorton arrives, and she uses him to gain entry. She induces a reluctant Lord Windermere to formally introduce her to his wife. This awkward moment does not go unnoticed, and gossip quickly spreads. However, Mrs. Erlynne adroitly flatters the chief gossiper, and soon she is accepted by the other women guests.

Unaware of this, Lady Windermere flees to the garden. She then thinks that she sees Mrs. Erlynne flirting with her husband. In fact, she is talking to Lorton, who asks Mrs. Erlynne to marry him. Mrs. Erlynne spots Lady Windermere and tries to clear up any confusion, but Lady Windermere will not listen. Instead, she flees to Darlington's house, though the man is still at her party. Mrs. Erlynne finds her farewell note to her husband and takes it away.

At Darlington's house, she tries to persuade Lady Windermere to go home, telling her that she ruined her life in exactly the same manner. Then Darlington arrives, accompanied by Lord Windermere and some other men, the ball having ended. The two women hide in another room, but Lady Windermere forgets her fan on a sofa. Lord Windermere demands that Lord Darlington explain what his wife's fan is doing there. Mrs. Erlynne comes out and apologizes for having taken it by mistake. All the guests, notably Lord Lorton, leave. Meanwhile, Lady Windermere leaves the house unseen.

The following day at breakfast, Mrs. Erlynne comes to return the fan and take leave of the Windermeres, as she is going back to France. Lady Windermere wants to tell her husband what really happened the day before, but Mrs. Erlynne dissuades her. On her way out, Mrs. Erlynne encounters Lord Lorton and tells him that she was shocked by his behavior the previous evening and that she no longer wants to marry him. He is flabbergasted, but after thinking it over, follows her into her taxi.

Cast

Box office
According to Warner Bros. records the film earned $324,000 domestically and $74,000 foreign.

Home media
The film is available on DVD in the More Treasures from American Film Archives collection.

References

External links

Lady Windermere's Fan essay by Scott Simmon on the National Film Registry website

Lady Windermere's fan at A Cinema History
 Lady Windermere’s Fan essay by Daniel Eagan in America's Film Legacy: The Authoritative Guide to the Landmark Movies in the National Film Registry, A&C Black, 2010 , pp. 108 - 109
Kramer, Fritzi, [https://moviessilently.com/2018/07/15/lady-windermeres-fan-1925-a-silent-film-review/ Lady Windermere's Fan (1925): A Silent Review]'', at moviessilently.com
Still at silenthollywood.com

1925 films
1925 romantic drama films
American black-and-white films
American romantic drama films
American silent feature films
Films based on Lady Windermere's Fan
Films directed by Ernst Lubitsch
Films set in London
United States National Film Registry films
Articles containing video clips
1920s English-language films
1920s American films
Silent romantic drama films
Silent American drama films